Avel Louise Gordly (born February 13, 1947) is an activist, community organizer, and former politician in the U.S. state of Oregon, who in 1996 became the first African-American woman to be elected to the Oregon State Senate. She served in the Senate from 1997 to 2009. Previously, she served for five years in the Oregon House of Representatives.

Early years
Gordly was one of three children born in Portland, Oregon, to a mother active in local leadership within the Order of the Eastern Star and a father who worked for the railroad. Her father was a strict authoritarian whom she feared. This fear kept them from being close and was also the reason for her brother, nine years her senior, would leave home early to join the Air Force. Her church community was a big influence on her, with many of the women, including her grandmothers, serving as role models. Her grandma Randolph was a founder in both the Oregon's Association of Colored Women's Clubs and Portland's Harriet Tubman Club. She graduated from Girls Polytechnic High School in 1965 (which later became James Monroe High School). She was the first woman in her family to graduate from high school. Prior to her high school graduation, Avel and her boyfriend (at the time) Neshell, became pregnant. The two married and then soon after he was drafted for the war in Vietnam. The marriage did not last after his return, but the two kept a good relationship for their son. After Avel and Neshell's separation she started to become interested in attending college, partly from visits to see her younger sister in Eugene who was attending the University of Oregon. After five years at Pacific Northwest Bell, she enrolled at Portland State University, earning a degree in the administration of justice. Though an avid reader, it was not until her time at Portland State University that she was first exposed to African American literature and noted how she had not been exposed to this during her time in the public school system. During her time at PSU she also applied to participate with Operations Crossroads Africa and was accepted, sending her to West Africa with most of her time spent in a small village in Nigeria, all of which would go on to be a life-changing experience. In 1974, she became the first person in her family to graduate from college. After graduating, Gordly began working with the State of Oregon Corrections Division as a counselor in a work release facility for women where she noticed racial bias that led to work release for black women and education release for white women.

Political office
Gordly was appointed to the Oregon House of Representatives in 1991, to replace Ron Cease, and later elected to the seat, ultimately serving three terms, representing parts of north and northeast Portland.  In 1996, she won election to the Oregon State Senate, the first African-American woman to do so; she served in the Senate from 1997 to 2009.  She was a member of the Democratic Party until late 2006, when she dropped her party registration, becoming a nonaffiliated voter.   She chose not to run for re-election in 2008.

In 2008, while serving as senator, OHSU opened the Avel Gordly Center for Healing, which provides mental health and psychiatric services.

Recent work
Gordly is an adjunct professor at her alma mater, and with Patricia A. Schecter, is the author of Remembering the Power of Words (2001), her memoirs, published by Oregon State University Press.

See also
 List of American politicians who switched parties in office

References

External links
 Biography and Curriculum Vitae at Portland State University
 Biography from The Oregon Encyclopedia
 Follow the Money - Avel Gordly (1992 1994 1996 2000 2004 2006)

Oregon state senators
Members of the Oregon House of Representatives
Portland State University alumni
Women state legislators in Oregon
1947 births
Living people
Benson Polytechnic High School alumni
African-American women in politics
African-American state legislators in Oregon
Oregon Democrats
Oregon Independents
21st-century American politicians
20th-century American politicians
21st-century American women politicians
20th-century American women politicians
African Americans in Oregon
African-American history of Oregon
20th-century African-American women
20th-century African-American politicians
21st-century African-American women
21st-century African-American politicians